Pasque Island is one of the Elizabeth Islands of Dukes County, Massachusetts, United States. It lies between Nashawena Island to the west and Naushon Island to the east. The island has a land area of 3.45 km² (1.333 sq mi or 853 acres) and had a population of 2 persons as of the 2000 census.  The island is part of the town of Gosnold, Massachusetts. It is owned by the Forbes family.

Elizabeth Islands
Coastal islands of Massachusetts
Populated coastal places in Massachusetts